Colonel Lacey Robert Johnson (1855–1915) was a Canadian Pacific Railway pioneer.

Early life and education
Lacey Johnson was born 22 June 1855, in Abingdon-on-Thames, the son of James Lacey Johnson, draper, of Market Place, Abingdon, Oxfordshire, England. He was educated at Abingdon School from 1865-1868.

Career
He entered the Great Western Railway works at Swindon (1870), then was chief engineer of paper mills and worked at Woolwich Royal Arsenal (1875).

He first went to India, and then to Canada, where he joined the Grand Trunk Railway (1882) and became chief engineer to the Canadian Pacific Railway. He was photographed in the Press with Lord Strathcona driving the last spike at Craigellachie (November 1885) for the CPR. He was general superintendent of shipping and superintendent of rolling stock at Montreal (1901). A member of the Canadian Society of Civil Engineers, he became president of the Canadian Railway Club, Squire of the Order of St John of Jerusalem and Grand Master of the Grand Lodge of British Columbia and the Yukon (1895–96).

Lacey Johnson served in the First World War as Colonel, Canadian Heavy Artillery and was responsible for the munitions output of Canada. He died in Montreal in 1915.

See also
 List of Old Abingdonians

References 

1855 births
1915 deaths
Canadian civil engineers
Canadian Pacific Railway executives
Canadian military personnel of World War I
English emigrants to Canada
Grand Trunk Railway executives
Locomotive builders and designers
People from Abingdon-on-Thames
People educated at Abingdon School
19th-century American businesspeople
Military personnel from Oxfordshire